Spheterista glaucoviridana is a moth of the family Tortricidae. It was first described by Lord Walsingham in 1907. It is endemic to the Hawaiian island of Kauai.

External links

Archipini
Endemic moths of Hawaii